General elections were held in the Solomon Islands on 19 November 2014. Independent candidates won 32 of the 50 seats in the National Parliament, with the Democratic Alliance Party emerging as the largest party with seven seats.

Background
The elections were assisted by the United Nations Development Programme, who wanted to help with "the development of a sustainable, cost effective and inclusive voter registration system to ensure the integrity of the vote."  Previous elections in 2006 were followed by racial rioting, particularly targeting Chinese immigrants.

Electoral system
The 50 members of the National Parliament were elected in single-member constituencies using the first-past-the-post system.

Voters had to be at least 18 years old and hold Solomon Islands citizenship. Overseas residents could not vote, and people were disqualified for voting if they had committed a breach of the electoral law, been declared insane, were imprisoned for more than six months, or were under a death sentence.

Candidates had to be at least 21 years old and resident in the constituency in which they ran. Disqualifications included holding dual citizenship, being executives or members of the Electoral Commission, having an undischarged bankruptcy, being imprisoned for more than six months, or being under a death sentence.

Campaign
A total of 443 candidates were nominated to contest the elections, a reduction on the 509 that ran in 2010.

Conduct
In March 2014 a biometric voter registration system was introduced. Transparency Solomon Islands claimed that it had received anecdotal evidence of some candidates purchasing numerous ID cards. However, in May the Electoral Commission stated that it had not received any formal complaints.

Following the elections, an election official attempted to steal a ballot box as it was taken for counting near Auki. After police started chasing the official, he dropped the box and disappeared into the jungle. The head of the Commonwealth election observers group commended the Solomon Islands for a peaceful election process.

Results
Prime Minister Gordon Darcy Lilo lost his seat in the Gizo-Kolombangara constituency, losing to his nephew Jimson Tanangada of the United Democratic Party.

As nearly two-thirds of the MPs returned are independent and the incumbent Prime Minister lost his seat, negotiations began to form a coalition government and select a new Prime Minister.

References

Solomons
Elections in the Solomon Islands
General